RANGER is a tactical UAV system (TUAV) built as a Swiss-Israeli joint venture between Swiss aerospace enterprise RUAG Aviation and Israeli aerospace company Israel Aerospace Industries. Its design and some of its technology is based on the Scout UAV system by Israel Aerospace Industries.

The RANGER UAV uses a compact hydraulic launcher for takeoff. Due to a modular payload, the system can be adapted to a wide range of civilian and military missions. A skid-based landing system enables the UAV to land nearly anywhere, on grass or on concrete runways, on snow or ice. According to the manufacturer, RANGER is the only tactical UAV system worldwide certified to fly in civilian airspace as well as over populated areas. The prototype is now at the Flieger-Flab-Museum in Dübendorf.

Operators
The consortium delivered the first Ranger system to the Swiss Air Force in June 1999 upon successful completion of military exercise conducted by the Swiss Armed Forces.

The RANGER system is in service with the Swiss Air Force under the designation ADS-95. From 1988 to 1999, an earlier variant called ADS-90 was in use. The Air Force's RANGERs are also used by Swiss police for reconnaissance, search and rescue missions. The current 15 ADS-95 will be replaced until 2019 by six Elbit Hermes 900.
The last flight of a Swiss Air Force ADS-95 (D-124) was on 27 November 2017.

The RANGER is also in service with the Finnish Defence Forces (FDF).

List of Operators

Former Operators 
: Swiss Air Force 7th Unmanned Aerial Vehicle Squadron, at Emmen Air Base

Technical data 

Type: Tactical UAV
Dimension
 Length: 4,61 m (15.13 ft)
 Height: 1,13 (3.71 ft)
 Wingspan: 5,71 m (18.73 ft)
Weight
 Maximum take-off weight: 285 kg (628 lb)
 Payload: 45 kg (99 lb)
Propulsion
 Engine type: 2 cylinder 2 stroke
 performance: 31,5 kW
Flight performance
 Speed: 240 km/h (130 kts) max.
 Service ceiling: up to 18'000 ft
 Range: up to 
 Endurance: up to 9 hours

External links 

 The manufacturer's RUAG Ranger website
 Swiss Air Force ADS-95 webpage
 IAI page about Ranger
 IAI Ranger brochure

References

Unmanned aerial vehicles of Switzerland
Unmanned aerial vehicles of Israel
Swiss military reconnaissance aircraft
Ranger
Single-engined pusher aircraft
Twin-boom aircraft